The Port of Missing Girls is a 1938 American film directed by Karl Brown and starring Harry Carey.

Cast 
Harry Carey as Captain Josiah Storm
Judith Allen as Della Mason
Milburn Stone as Jim Benton
Betty Compson as Chicago
Matty Fain as Duke Ransom
George Cleveland as Clinton
Jane Jones as Minnie
Willy Castello as Manuel

Soundtrack 
Judith Allen - "Dream Cargo" (Written by Eddie Cherkose and Charles Rosoff)
Judith Allen - "One, Night, One Kiss and You" (Written by Eddie Cherkose and Charles Rosoff)
Jane Jones - "I Changed My Routine" (Written by Eddie Cherkose and Charles Rosoff)

External links 

1938 films
1930s romance films
American black-and-white films
Monogram Pictures films
American romance films
1930s English-language films
1930s American films